Tripartite motif containing 69 is a protein that in humans is encoded by the TRIM69 gene.

Function

This gene encodes a member of the RING-B-box-coiled-coil (RBCC) family and encodes a protein with an N-terminal RING finger motif, a PRY domain and a C-terminal SPRY domain. The mouse ortholog of this gene is specifically expressed in germ cells at the round spermatid stages during spermatogenesis and, when overexpressed, induces apoptosis. Alternatively spliced transcript variants encoding distinct isoforms have been described.

References

External links 
 PDBe-KB provides an overview of all the structure information available in the PDB for Human E3 ubiquitin-protein ligase TRIM69

Further reading 

Human proteins